Felipe Alejandro Virzi López (1943 – 3 February 2022) was a Panamanian politician. A member of the Democratic Revolutionary Party, he served as Second Vice President from 1994 to 1999. He died in the Santiago District on 3 February 2022, at the age of 79.

References

1943 births
2022 deaths
Democratic Revolutionary Party politicians
People from Santiago District, Veraguas
Vice presidents of Panama